Benoist is both a French surname and a given name. Notable people with the name include:

Surnames
 Alain de Benoist (born 1943), French academic and philosopher
 Antoine Benoist (painter) (1632–1717), French artist who was painter and sculptor to Louis XIV
 Antoine Benoist (engraver) (by 1721–1770), French draughtsman and engraver in London
 Antoine-Gabriel-François Benoist (1715–1776), French soldier
 Élie Benoist (1640–1728), French Protestant minister, known as an historian of the Edict of Nantes
 Félix Benoist (1818–1896), French painter and lithographer
 François Benoist (1794–1878), French organist, composer, and pedagogue
 Françoise-Albine Benoist (1724–1808 or 1809), French writer
 Gabriel Benoist (1891–1964), a French writer in the Cauchois dialect of the Norman language
 Guillaume Philippe Benoist (1725–1770), French line-engraver
 Jacques Benoist-Méchin (1901–1983), French politician and writer
 Joseph Roger de Benoist (1923–2017), French missionary, journalist, and historian
 Lance Benoist (born 1988), American mixed martial artist 
 Louis Auguste Benoist (1803–1867), pioneering American banker and financier
 Luc Benoist (1893–1980), French essayist
 Marcel Benoist (died 1918), French lawyer who established the Swiss Marcel Benoist Prize
 Marie-Guillemine Benoist (1768–1826), French neoclassical, historical and genre painter
 Melissa Benoist (born 1988), American actress and singer
 Michel Benoist (1715–1774),  French Jesuit scientist noted for his service to the Chinese Empire
 Raymond Benoist (1881–1970), French zoologist and botanist
 Robert Benoist (1895–1944), French Grand Prix motor racing driver and World War II secret agent
 Thomas W. Benoist (1874–1917), American aviator, aircraft manufacturer, and airline entrepreneur

Given names
 Benoist Simmat (b. ? ), French author and journalist 
 Benoist Stehlin (ca. 1732-1774), French harpsichord builder

See also
 Condé Benoist Pallen (1858-1929), American Catholic editor and author
 Benois
 Benoit (disambiguation)